Saait Magiet (17 May 1952 – 17 July 2018) was a South African cricketer. He played in more than 60 first-class matches for Western Province from 1971/72 to 1990/91, scoring more than 2,300 runs and taking 169 wickets. Magiet was on holiday in Malaysia when he suffered a fatal heart attack. His funeral took place in Constantia, with thousands of people in attendance.

References

External links
 

1952 births
2018 deaths
South African cricketers
Western Province cricketers
Cricketers from Cape Town